Yunnan cuisine, alternatively known as Dian cuisine, is an amalgam of the cuisines of the Han Chinese and other ethnic minority groups in Yunnan Province in southwestern China. As the province with the largest number of ethnic minority groups, Yunnan cuisine is vastly varied, and it is difficult to make generalisations. Many Yunnan dishes are quite spicy, and mushrooms are featured prominently. Flowers, ferns, algae and insects may also be eaten. The cuisine of Yunnan is often compared to the cuisine of Southeast Asia as the province borders the region and many of the ethnic minorities or related cultural groups also have a presence in Southeast Asia.

Three of the province's most famous products are the renowned Pu'er tea, which was traditionally grown in Ning'er; Xuanwei ham, which is often used to flavour stewed and braised foods in Chinese cuisine and for making the stocks and broths of many Chinese soups; and guoqiao (crossing the bridge), a rice noodle soup with chicken, pig's kidney and liver, fish and pickled pork.

Yunnan cuisine is unique in China for its cheeses like Rubing and Rushan cheese made by the Bai people. Other influences include Mongolian influence during the Yuan dynasty (i.e. Central Asian settlement in Yunnan), and the proximity and influence of India and Tibet on Yunnan.  Yunnan cuisine is gaining popularity in the west. Likening the food vlogger Dianxi Xiaoge to the Chinese documentary television series A Bite of China, Xinhua said Dianxi Xiaoge could be called A Bite of Yunnan in introducing Yunnan cuisine to the world.

Notable dishes

Characteristic features

Abundant ecological raw materials 
Yunnan is located in the Yunnan-Guizhou plateau, with an extended range of mountains, plains, and lakes, forming a colorful scenery and three-dimensional climate of tropical, subtropical, temperate, and cold zones. This kind of diverse physiognomy and environment are beneficial to the growth of a variety of plants and animals. Yunnan is known as the "fungus kingdom," "plant kingdom," and "animal kingdom." It is one of the regions with the most abundant edible wild fungus resources in China. There are more than 250 kinds of edible native fungus, among which common ones are bovine liver fungus, Qingtou fungus, chicken fir fungus, dried fungus, bamboo sun fungus, matsutake fungus and so on.

Unique cooking technique 
The cooking technique is an essential factor in cooking dishes. Many dishes are unique in their varied use of cooking utensils, fire, flavors, and colors. Yunnan is known for its diversity and ethnic minorities. The ancient cooking methods of 25 ethnic minorities found in Yunnan are merging with the cooking techniques of the Han nationality, which makes Yunnan cuisine uniquely flavorsome and colorful. In the province, the Han peoples' techniques of steaming, frying, sautéeing (with starch extract), braising, quick-boiling, boiling, and stewing are melding with the methods of minority techniques of baking, grinding with mortar and pestle, heat-contact, curing, cooking on stone, preserving with salt and other cooking methods.

For example:

Bamboo rice: Adding glutinous rice into bamboo to make bamboo rice with soft and glutinous fragrance.
Pineapple rice: Pineapple purple rice made with hollowed pineapple with fragrant pineapple flavor.
Steamed chicken: Steamed chicken made with Jianshui purple pottery special steam cooker with original flavor.

See also
 List of Chinese dishes
 List of edible insects by country

References

 
Regional cuisines of China